Mavuso Sports Centre is a multi-use stadium in Manzini, Eswatini.  It is currently used mostly for football matches.

The stadium has a capacity of 5,000 spectators. Also known as Trade Fair Ground, it is also used for traditional events such as king's birthday ceremonies. A new stadium has been proposed to replace it soon. Once the new stadium is completed, Trade Fair Ground will be demolished.

References

External links
Article on Trade Fair Ground and proposed new stadium

Football venues in Eswatini
Manzini, Eswatini

ca:Young Buffaloes Football Club